Fritz Heinrich Rasp (13 May 1891 – 30 November 1976) was a German film actor who appeared in more than 100 films between 1916 and 1976. His obituary in Der Spiegel described Rasp as "the German film villain in service, for over 60 years."

Life and career
Fritz Heinrich Rasp was the thirteenth child of a county surveyor. He was educated from 1908–1909 at the Theaterschule Otto Königin in Munich. He made his stage debut in 1909, after he successfully overcame a speech impediment. During his long career, the character actor appeared in some of the most famous theatres in Germany, working with acclaimed directors such as Bertolt Brecht and Max Reinhardt and famous actors such as Albert Bassermann, Joseph Schildkraut and Werner Krauss. Rasp made an early film debut in 1916 and appeared in some early films by his friend, director Ernst Lubitsch. With his "gaunt, ascetic looks", Rasp played numerous scoundrels or shady characters during the Golden Age of German cinema in the 1920s. He is considered to be one of the most successful film villains in German film history.

Some of Rasp's more notable film roles were "J. J. Peachum" in The Threepenny Opera (1931), as the reckless seducer Meinert in Diary of a Lost Girl (1929), as Mr. Brocklehurst in Orphan of Lowood (1926), an early German adaptation of Jane Eyre, and as the bank robber Grundeis in Emil and the Detectives (1931). He also portrayed the mysterious "Der Schmale" ("The Thin Man") in Fritz Lang's Metropolis (1927). Many of the scenes in the latter film in which he appears are part of the Metropolis footage long believed lost until their recovery in 2008. In the 1960s, Rasp also appeared in numerous Edgar Wallace criminal films. In one of his last films, Bernhard Sinkel's comedy-drama Lina Braake (1975), Rasp starred against-type as a likable pensioner who steals money from an unscrupulous bank.

Fritz Rasp was awarded with the Filmband in Gold in 1963 for his outstanding work for the German film industry.

Personal life
Fritz Rasp died of cancer at age 85 in Gräfelfing, where he is also buried. His son Andreas Rasp (1921–2013) was a Gymnasium teacher and poet, his daughter Renate Rasp (1935–2015) a notable writer associated with the Group 47.

Selected filmography

 Shoe Palace Pinkus (1916)
 Hans Trutz in the Land of Plenty (1917)
 The Lost House (1922)
 Youth (1922) - Amandus
 Man by the Wayside (1923) - Farmhand
 Time Is Money (1923) - François
 Between Evening and Morning (1923)
 Warning Shadows (1923) - Diener
 Arabella (1924)
 Comedians (1925) - Jugendlicher Liebhaber
 Wood Love (1925) - Tom Snout
 The Doll of Luna Park (1925)
 Goetz von Berlichingen of the Iron Hand (1925)
 People of the Sea (1925)
 The House of Lies (1926) - Kandidat Molwik
 Torments of the Night (1926) - Kellner
 Love's Joys and Woes (1926)
 Superfluous People (1926) - Chirikov
 Orphan of Lowood (1926) - Brocklehurst
 Metropolis (1927) - Der Schmale / The Thin Man
 Children's Souls Accuse You (1927) - Heinrich Voss - Enzenbergs Sekretär
 The Last Waltz (1927) - Linnsky, Hofmarschall
 The Love of Jeanne Ney (1927) - Khalibiev
 The Prince of Rogues (1928) - Heinrich Benzel
 The Mysterious Mirror (1928) - reicher Mann
 Spione (1928) - Col. Jellusic - Ivan Stepanov, English version
 Docks of Hamburg (1928) - The doctor
 The Hound of the Baskervilles (1929) - Stapleton
 Diary of a Lost Girl (1929) - Meinert
 Woman in the Moon (1929) - Der Mann, der sich Walter Turner nennt
 Three Around Edith (1929) - Pistol
 Spring Awakening (1929) - Lehrer Habebald
 The Dreyfus Case (1930) - Maj. DuPatay de Clam
 The Great Longing (1930) - Himself
 The Murderer Dimitri Karamazov (1931) - Smerdjakoff
 The Threepenny Opera (1931) - Peachum
 Tropical Nights (1931) - Jones
 The Squeaker (1931) - Frank Sutton
 The Paw (1931) - Dr. Ing. Rappis
 Emil and the Detectives (1931) - Grundeis
 Die Vier vom Bob 13 (1932) - Schmidt
 The Cruel Mistress (1932) - Professor Bock
 The Ringer (1932) - Maurice Meister
 Der sündige Hof (1933) - Veit, der Schäfer
 The Judas of Tyrol (1933) - Raffl
 Grenzfeuer (1934) - Nothaas - Grenzhofbauer
 Schuß am Nebelhorn (1934) - Sebastian Geyer, Forstgehilfe
 Charley's Aunt (1934) - Lord Babberley
 Little Dorrit (1934) - Flintwinch
 Decoy (1934) - de Groot, ihr Vormund
 Asew (1935) - Lockspitzel Asew
 The Emperor's Candlesticks (1936) - Stanislaus
 Uncle Bräsig (1936) - Slusohr, ein Gauner
 The Hound of the Baskervilles (1937) - Barrymore
 Togger (1937) - Dublanc
 Einmal werd' ich Dir gefallen (1938) - Theo - Haushofmeister
 So You Don't Know Korff Yet? (1938) - Kelley
 The Life and Loves of Tschaikovsky (1939) - Porphyr Philippowitsch Kruglikow, Kritiker
 Woman in the River (1939) - Wendelin
 Passion (1940) - Boddin
 Alarm (1941) - Feinmechaniker Stülken
 Paracelsus (1943) - Der Magister
 Somewhere in Berlin (1946) - Waldemar Hunke
 Scandal at the Embassy (1950) - Inspector Kick
 House of Life (1952) - Der Verführer (uncredited)
 Hocuspocus (1953) - Diener
 The Mill in the Black Forest (1953)
 The Cornet (1955) - Großwesir
 Magic Fire (1956) - Pfistermeister
 Der Frosch mit der Maske (1959) - Ezra Maitland
 The Crimson Circle (1960) - Froyant
 The Terrible People (1960) - Lord Godley Long
 The Black Sheep (1960) - Lord Kingsley
 The Strange Countess (1961) - Lawyer Shaddle
 The Puzzle of the Red Orchid (1962) - Tanner
 Das schwarz-weiß-rote Himmelbett (1962) - Pfarrer / Parson
 Erotikon - Karussell der Leidenschaften (1963) - Der Schloßverwalter
 Praetorius (1965) - Shunderson
 Lina Braake (1975) - Gustaf Haertlein
 Dorothea Merz (1976, TV film) - Der alte Merz

References

External links
 
 Photographs and literature
 

1891 births
1976 deaths
20th-century German male actors
German male film actors
German male silent film actors
People from Bayreuth
Deaths from cancer in Germany